Alex Woods may refer to:
 Alex Woods (soccer) (born 1986), American soccer player
 Alexx Woods, character on television show CSI: Miami

See also
Al Woods (disambiguation)
Alex Wood (disambiguation)